Karolcik Building, also known as the Perry Theater, is a historic commercial and theater building located at Perryopolis, Fayette County, Pennsylvania. It was built in 1921, and is a two-story, rectangular brick and terra cotta building.  Its design is influenced by the bungalow and American Craftsman movement.  The building has housed a variety of commercial and entertainment activities including a theater, bowling alley and poolroom, and meeting room.  The second floor also housed an apartment.

It was added to the National Register of Historic Places in 1997.

References

Commercial buildings on the National Register of Historic Places in Pennsylvania
Commercial buildings completed in 1921
Buildings and structures in Fayette County, Pennsylvania
National Register of Historic Places in Fayette County, Pennsylvania